The Snowboarding competition of the 2018 Winter Paralympics was held on 12 and 16 March 2018 at the Jeongseon Alpine Centre in Gangneung, South Korea.

Classification 

Para-snowboarding is divided into three classification categories.
 SB-LL1  Athletes competing in the class SB-LL1 have significant impairment to one leg, such as amputation above the knee, or "a significant combined impairment in two legs", affecting their balance, their board-control and their ability to navigate uneven terrain. Athletes with annotations will use prostheses during racing.
 SB-LL2  Athletes competing in the class SB-LL2 have impairment to one or both legs "with less activity limitation", such as below-knee amputation.
 SB-UL  Athletes competing in the class SB-UL have upper limb impairments, affecting balance. There are no events for female athletes in the category SB-UL in the 2018 games.

Competition schedule
The following is the competition schedule for all 10 events (five categories in snowboard cross and five in banked slalom).

All times are local (UTC+9).

Medal summary

Medal table
The ranking in the table is based on information provided by the International Paralympic Committee (IPC) and will be consistent with IPC convention in its published medal tables. By default, the table will be ordered by the number of gold medals the athletes from a nation have won (in this context, a "nation" is an entity represented by a National Paralympic Committee). The number of silver medals is taken into consideration next and then the number of bronze medals. If nations are still tied, equal ranking is given and they are listed alphabetically by IPC country code.

Women's events

Men's events

References

External links
 PyeongChang Official website 
International Paralympic Committee PyeongChang website
Official Results Book – Snowboard

 
2018 Winter Paralympics events
2018
2018 in snowboarding
Snowboarding in South Korea